The Gorzen is a nature park in the Dutch province of South Holland, located on the eastside of Ridderkerk, between the New Veer and the New harbor. The park was formed in consequences of all kinds of activities and circumstances in a period of half a century shaped in a hillside nature park with a few lakes and brooks.

External links
Nature association Ridderkerk 
Ridderkerk (official website) 

Parks in South Holland
Ridderkerk